This Summer is the second extended play by Canadian singer and songwriter Alessia Cara. It was released on September 6, 2019, through Def Jam and Universal Music Canada. Cara wrote or co-wrote all the tracks, working closely with Jon Levine, Midi Jones, and Mike Sabath. Two singles were released from the EP, "Ready" and "Rooting for You".

Background
On July 18, 2019, Cara announced that she would be releasing an EP entitled This Summer, with the first single, "Ready", released on July 22. Through social media, Cara stated, "Caught the writing bug out of the blue and made an EP. It's called This Summer. I'll be releasing a new track every couple of weeks until its release."

Track listing
Credits adapted from Tidal.

Personnel

 Alessia Cara – vocals, composer, lyricist, production
 Jon Levine – production, bass, drum programmer, guitar
 Midi Jones – production, bass, drum programmer, guitar
 Caye – production, background vocals, bass, piano
 Mike Sabath – production, lyricist, background vocals, bass, drums, guitar, piano, synthesizer
 Olivia Aita – background vocals 
 Darwin Derequito – engineer, studio personnel
 Chris Gehringer – mastering engineer, studio personnel 
 Matty Green – mixer, studio personnel
 Andrew Dawson – mixer
 Joe Zook – mixer
 Ross Newbauer – assistant mixer, studio personnel
 Jon Sosin, guitar
 Bryan Matheson, studio personnel
 Imogen Teasley-Vlautin, studio personnel

Charts

References

2019 EPs
Def Jam Recordings EPs
Alessia Cara albums